The 1980 CRC Chemicals Rebel 500 was a NASCAR Winston Cup Series racing event that was held on April 13, 1980, at Darlington Raceway in Darlington, South Carolina.

Race report
There were 36 American-born drivers on the grid. A multiple-car crash where Ricky Rudd and Richard Petty collided in Turn 1 collected numerous cars, with Neil Bonnett never completing the first lap. David Pearson would earn his final victory ever as a NASCAR Cup Series driver as he defeated Benny Parsons by three seconds. Lake Speed would finish in the top ten only three races after his Cup Series debut. This would be the seventh Spring Darlington win for Pearson in addition to two victories in a row at Darlington for David Pearson. Hoss Ellington would receive his final NASCAR Winston Cup Series win for the #1 Hawaiian Tropic team.

Most of the cars in this race were Chevrolets. The race took two hours and twenty-three minutes to complete. Almost the entire "top ten" grid were driving Chevrolet vehicles. Harry Gant would achieve his first top five finish; marking a precedence for more than 100 top five finishes. Winnings for this race varied from $21,340 for the winner ($ when adjusted for inflation) to $1,800 for the last-place finisher ($ when adjusted for inflation).  The total purse was $173,565 ($ when adjusted for inflation).

Melvin Revis would retire from NASCAR Cup Series competition after this race while David Pearson would not win again.

Notable crew chiefs were Junie Donlavey, Joey Arrington, Darrell Bryant, Dale Inman, D.K. Ulrich, Waddell Wilson, Kirk Shelmerdine, Jake Elder among others.

Qualifying

Finishing order
Section reference: 

 David Pearson (No. 1)
 Benny Parsons (No. 27)
 Harry Gant (No. 47)
 Darrell Waltrip (No. 88)
 Dick Brooks (No. 7)
 Lennie Pond (No. 68)
 Joe Millikan (No. 72)
 Lake Speed (No. 66)
 Richard Petty (No. 43)
 Jody Ridley (No. 90)
 Sterling Marlin (No. 5)
 Cale Yarborough* (No. 11)
 Bobby Wawak (No. 74)
 Buddy Arrington (No. 67)
 Tommy Gale (No. 64)
 Roger Hamby (No. 17)
 John Anderson (No. 19)
 James Hylton (No. 48)
 Ricky Rudd (No. 40)
 Bill Elswick (No. 75)
 Richard Childress (No. 3)
 J.D. McDuffie (No. 70)
 Dave Marcis* (No. 71)
 Dick May (No. 99)
 Slick Johnson (No. 53)
 Ronnie Thomas* (No. 25)
 Buck Simmons* (No. 12)
 Jimmy Means (No. 25)
 Dale Earnhardt* (No. 2)
 Bobby Allison* (No. 15)
 Baxter Price* (No. 45)
 Terry Labonte* (No. 44)
 Melvin Revis* (No. 59)
 Cecil Gordon* (No. 82)
 Buddy Baker* (No. 28)
 Neil Bonnett* (No. 21)

* Driver failed to finish race

Timeline
Section reference: 
 Start of race: David Pearson was leading the racing grid as the green flag was waved.
 Lap 14: Dale Earnhardt took over the lead from David Pearson.
 Lap 28: Lennie Pond took over the lead from Dale Earnhardt.
 Lap 29: Dave Marcis took over the lead from Lennie Pond.
 Lap 32: Dale Earnhardt took over the lead from Dave Marcis.
 Lap 33: David Pearson took over the lead from Dale Earnhardt.
 Lap 87: Lennie Pond took over the lead from David Pearson.
 Lap 88: Cale Yarborough took over the lead from Lennie Pond.
 Lap 123: Benny Parsons took over the lead from Cale Yarborough.
 Lap 135: Darrell Waltrip took over the lead from Benny Parsons.
 Lap 150: Benny Parsons took over the lead from Darrell Waltrip.
 Lap 158: David Pearson took over the lead from Benny Parsons.
 Finish: David Pearson was pronounced the winner of the event.

Standings after the race

References

CRC Chemicals Rebel 500
CRC Chemicals Rebel 500
CRC Chemicals Rebel 500
NASCAR races at Darlington Raceway